Morann is an unincorporated community in Clearfield County, Pennsylvania, United States. Morann has a post office with ZIP code 16663, which opened on June 19, 1890.

References

Unincorporated communities in Clearfield County, Pennsylvania
Unincorporated communities in Pennsylvania